Pink Cream 69 is the first full-length album from Pink Cream 69, released in 1989.

Track listing

Singles
One Step into Paradise
 "One Step into Paradise" (extended version)
 "Partymaker"
 "Shadows Are Falling"

Close Your Eyes
 "Close Your Eyes"
 "Child of Sorrows"

Personnel
 Andi Deris - vocals
 Alfred Koffler - guitar
 Dennis Ward - bass
 Kosta Zafiriou - drums, synth-drums, keyboards

References

Pink Cream 69 albums
1989 debut albums
Epic Records albums
Albums produced by Dirk Steffens